Hsu Li-ming (born 17 January 1969) is a Taiwanese politician.

Political career
Hsu chaired the Greater Kaohsiung Research, Development and Evaluation Commission before he became a deputy mayor of Kaohsiung in 2015. He was named acting mayor of Kaohsiung in April 2018, as predecessor Chen Chu was appointed presidential secretary general.

References

Living people
Mayors of Kaohsiung
1969 births